Scott Hosking (born 9 March 1967) is a former Australian rules footballer who played with Geelong in the Victorian Football League (VFL).

Hosking, originally from Lismore in the Western Plains Football League, played just one league game for Geelong, in the 1986 VFL season. It was Geelong's round 15 loss to Collingwood at Kardinia Park. His father, Ron Hosking, played with Geelong during the 1960s.

He is currently Football Manager for Geelong Football League side St Mary's, a club he also played for.

References

1967 births
Australian rules footballers from Victoria (Australia)
Geelong Football Club players
St Mary's Sporting Club Inc players
Living people